Ruth Frances Long, also known as R.F. Long and Jessica Thorne, (20 April 1971) is an Irish author who writes in the fantasy and romance genres. Her novel, The Stone's Heart by Jessica Thorne, was nominated for the Romantic Novelists' Association Fantasy Romantic Novel award. Her latest series the Hollow King has begun with Mageborn while she has had several individual novels.

Biography
Ruth Long is a Dublin-born writer of fantasy novels, novellas and short stories both for adults and young adults. She completed a M.A. in English Literature and also studied History of Religions and Celtic Civilisation.

Long has always been interested in fantasy, romance and ancient mysteries. Along with writing, she is a librarian working initially in the County Dublin library system. Long is now head librarian for a private specialized library of rare and unusual books. She currently lives in Wicklow.

Long originally wrote novels and novellas as R.F. Long. The Scroll Thief, Soul Fire, The Wolf's Sister, The Wolf's Mate & The Wolf's Destiny were republished in 2019.

Her first novel as Ruth Frances Long was The Treachery of Beautiful Things in 2012, a 10th anniversary edition was released in 2022. She then released The Dubh Linn trilogy beginning with A Crack in Everything, which was published each year beginning in 2014.

Long signed with digital publisher Bookouture for the publication of fantasy novels, beginning with The Queen's Wing series written under the pen name Jessica Thorne.The Stone's Heart was nominated for the Romantic Novelists' Association Romantic Fantasy novel of the year. Thorne's duology the Hollow King began in February 2020 with Mageborn. Long has since had several standalone novels published under this name.

Awards
 In 2015 Long won the Spirit of Dedication Award for 'Best Creator of Children's Science Fiction and Fantasy' for A Crack in Everything  from the European Science Fiction Society (ESFS), announced at the 37th Annual European Science Fiction Convention (Eurocon 2015) in St. Petersburg, Russia.

Bibliography

R.F. Long

Short stories 

Elements appeared in Flashing Swords' Summer Special (2008)
Carrying Keptara in the Hadley Rille Books Anthology Ruins Metropolis (2008)
The Wrecker's Daughter in the Fall issue of Ocean Magazine (2008)

The Holtlands 

The Wolf's Sister (2008)
The Wolf's Mate (2009)
 The Wolf's Destiny (2011)

Novels 

The Scroll Thief (2009)
Soul Fire (2010)
Songs of the Wolf: Tales of the Holtlands (2010) (collection of the novellas The Wolf's Sister and The Wolf's Mate)

Ruth Frances Long 

The Treachery of Beautiful Things (2012)

The Dubh Linn series
A Crack in Everything (2014)
A Hollow in the Hills (2015)
A Darkness at the End (2016)

Jessica Thorne 
The Lost Girls of Foxfield Hall (March 2021)
The Bookbinder's Daughter (September 2021)
The Water Witch (August 2022)
The Queen's Wing
The Queen's Wing (November 2018)
The Stone's Heart (February 2019)
The Hollow King
 Mageborn (February 2020)
 Nightborn (May 2020)

References

Further reading

External links 
 
Top 10 Romance Fiction for Youth 2013
O'Brien Press Ltd.
Agent's Official Site

Writing.ie Interview

21st-century Irish novelists
Irish fantasy writers
Irish women novelists
1971 births
Living people
Women science fiction and fantasy writers
21st-century Irish women writers
Irish romantic fiction writers
Women romantic fiction writers
Irish writers of young adult literature
Women writers of young adult literature
People from County Dublin
People from County Wicklow
Alumni of the University of Aberdeen
People educated at Rathdown School